Valerio Onida (30 March 1936 – 14 May 2022) was an Italian jurist, and constitutional law professor, Judge of the Constitutional Court of Italy and President of the Court from September 2004 to January 2005.

Biography
Professor of Constitutional Law at the University of Milan from 1983 to 2009, in January 1996, Onida was elected Judge of the Constitutional Court of Italy by the Parliament. He remained in office for nine years, until January 2005. In the last four months, Onida has also been President of the Constitutional Court.

In 2010, Onida was a candidate for the center-left primary elections for the Mayor of Milan, and he ranked third: the winner was Giuliano Pisapia, who was later elected Mayor.

Onida was very critical of the 2016 constitutional referendum proposed by Prime Minister Matteo Renzi and appealed against it, since, according to him, too many questions were presented in the referendum. Onida's appeal was rejected and he announced that on 4 December he would have voted "No".

References

1936 births
2022 deaths
Italian jurists
Judges of the Constitutional Court of Italy
Lawyers from Milan
Presidents of the Constitutional Court of Italy
Knights Grand Cross of the Order of Merit of the Italian Republic
University of Milan alumni
Academic staff of the University of Milan
Academic staff of the University of Pavia